Dolzhik is a rural locality (a khutor) in Sergeyevskoye Rural Settlement, Podgorensky District, Voronezh Oblast, Russia. The population was 64 as of 2010. There are two streets.

Geography 
Sergeyevka is the nearest rural locality.

References

Rural localities in Podgorensky District